Pedro Miguel das Neves Correia (born 22 November 1974), known simply as Pedro, is a Portuguese former footballer who played as a goalkeeper.

He played solely for Paços de Ferreira in his professional career.

Club career
Pedro was born in Paços de Ferreira. Joining hometown's F.C. Paços de Ferreira when he was just 10 years old, he was given his Primeira Liga debut by coach José Mota in a 1993 match against S.C. Salgueiros, and went on to make 325 competitive appearances for the club.

In 2002–03, as a starter, Pedro helped Paços to achieve a sixth place in the league, a feat repeated in the 2006–07 season, this time good enough for qualification for the UEFA Cup, although he was a backup during the latter campaign.

Pedro retired from football in June 2009 aged 34, but stayed connected with his only professional club, working as goalkeeper coach under several managers.

See also
List of one-club men

References

External links

1974 births
Living people
People from Paços de Ferreira
Sportspeople from Porto District
Portuguese footballers
Association football goalkeepers
Primeira Liga players
Liga Portugal 2 players
F.C. Paços de Ferreira players
Portuguese expatriate sportspeople in Gabon
Portuguese expatriate sportspeople in Tunisia
Portuguese expatriate sportspeople in Romania